In mathematics, particularly topology, a topological space X is locally normal if intuitively it looks locally like a normal space. More precisely, a locally normal space satisfies the property that each point of the space belongs to a neighbourhood of the space that is normal under the subspace topology.

Formal definition

A topological space X is said to be locally normal if and only if each point, x, of X has a neighbourhood that is normal under the subspace topology.

Note that not every neighbourhood of x has to be normal, but at least one neighbourhood of x has to be normal (under the subspace topology).

Note however, that if a space were called locally normal if and only if each point of the space belonged to a subset of the space that was normal under the subspace topology, then every topological space would be locally normal. This is because, the singleton {x} is vacuously normal and contains x. Therefore, the definition is more restrictive.

Examples and properties

 Every locally normal T1 space is locally regular and locally Hausdorff.
 A locally compact Hausdorff space is always locally normal.
 A normal space is always locally normal.
 A T1 space need not be locally normal as the set of all real numbers endowed with the cofinite topology shows.

See also

Further reading

References

Topology
Properties of topological spaces